UFC Fight Night: Strickland vs. Imavov (also known as UFC Fight Night 217, UFC on ESPN+ 75 and UFC Vegas 67) was a mixed martial arts event produced by the Ultimate Fighting Championship that took place on January 14, 2023, at the UFC Apex facility in Enterprise, Nevada, part of the Las Vegas Metropolitan Area, United States.

Background
A middleweight bout between former interim UFC Middleweight Championship challenger and The Ultimate Fighter: Team Jones vs. Team Sonnen middleweight winner Kelvin Gastelum and Nassourdine Imavov was scheduled to headline the event. The pair was previously scheduled to meet at UFC 273, but Imavov was forced to withdraw due to visa issues. However, the week of the event, Gastelum withdrew due to a mouth injury and was replaced by Sean Strickland, with the bout taking place at light heavyweight.

A heavyweight bout between Jailton Almeida and Shamil Abdurakhimov was originally announced for this date. However the UFC issued a correction a short time later announcing the fight was set for UFC 283 the following week.

A flyweight bout between Jeff Molina and Jimmy Flick was expected to take place at the event. However, Molina withdrew from the event due to undisclosed reasons and was replaced by Charles Johnson. A few weeks later it was announced that Molina was under suspension by the Nevada Athletic Commission as he has been linked to an investigation around the Nov. 5 fight between Darrick Minner and Shayilan Nuerdanbieke.

Welterweights Geoff Neal and Shavkat Rakhmonov were expected to meet at this event. However on December 29, Neal pulled out due to undisclosed injury and the bout was rescheduled for UFC 285.

Omar Morales was expected to face Mateusz Rębecki in a lightweight bout. However, Morales withdrew from the bout for undisclosed reasons and was replaced by Nick Fiore.

Isaac Dulgarian was expected to face Daniel Argueta in a featherweight bout. However, Dulgarian withdrew from the bout for undisclosed reasons and was replaced by promotional newcomer Nick Aguirre.

A Featherweight bout between Jarno Errens and David Onama was scheduled for this event. Errens however substained a shoulder injury in December and the bout was scrapped.

A women's flyweight bout between Priscila Cachoeira and Sijara Eubanks was expected to take place at the event. However, the day before the event, Eubanks was forced to withdraw due to weight management issues and the bout was scrapped.

Results

Bonus awards 
The following fighters received $50,000 bonuses.
Fight of the Night: No bonus awarded.
Performance of the Night: Dan Ige, Roman Kopylov, Umar Nurmagomedov, and Allan Nascimento

See also 

 List of UFC events
 List of current UFC fighters
 2023 in UFC

References 

UFC Fight Night
2023 in mixed martial arts
January 2023 sports events in the United States
2023 in sports in Nevada
Mixed martial arts in Las Vegas
Sports competitions in Las Vegas